The 2017 AMA Motocross Championship season is the 45th AMA Motocross National Championship season, the premier motocross series in USA. Ken Roczen goes into the season as the defending champion in the 450 class after taking his second national title in 2016. In the 250 class Cooper Webb is the defending champion after taking his maiden title last season.

Calendar and Results

450cc

250cc

450 Class

Entry List

Riders Championship
{|
|

250 Class

Entry List

Riders Championship
{|
|

See also 
 2017 FIM Motocross World Championship

References

2017 in motorcycle sport
AMA Motocross Championship